Manmani (Happy-Go-Lucky) is a 1947 Hindi social film directed by Sarvottam Badami and produced by Ajit Pictures. It had music composed by Kamal Dasgupta. This was the last film of actress Ragini in pre-partition India before she shifted to Pakistan. The film starred P. Jairaj, Ragini, Sabita Devi, E. Billimoria, Nazir Hussain, Maruti, Amar and Shrinath.

The story revolves around the grooming of a young village girl by a wealthy city man due to a bet.

Plot
Manohar, a wealthy young man and Shashi, a young city girl are good friends. They argue about who is a bigger spendthrift, man or woman. Manohar decides to prove that it's the female and for that he finds a young village girl Tara, who he decides to use as an experiment. Tara resides in the village with her father, but agrees to go to the city With Manohar to get photographed. In the city she lives with Manohar and he starts grooming her into a perfect lady. She learns the ways and then decides to go to see her father in the village. Manohar has fallen in love with Tara but is unable to tell Shashi, who also loves him. When the villagers taunt Tara for staying alone with a young man in the city, she lets them know that she and Manohar are getting married. She returns to the city with her father, only to find Manohar showing slides of the different stages of development in Tara's grooming to a group of people. Misunderstandings arise only to be sorted out finally when Manohar explains.

Cast
 P. Jairaj
 Ragini
 Sabita Devi
 E. Billimoria
 Nazir Hussain
 Maruti
 Amar
 Shrinath

Music
The music composer was Kamal Dasgupta and the songs were sung by Kalyani Das, Hemant Kumar and Santosh Sengupta

Songlist

References

External links

1947 films
1940s Hindi-language films
Indian black-and-white films
Films directed by Sarvottam Badami
Films scored by Kamal Dasgupta